The Rugby League Conference National Division (known as the National League Three From 2003 to 2003) was the fourth division of the British rugby league system. In 2012, it became the seventh tier of the system and was known as the National Conference League Division 3 when the Rugby League Conference was reformed and later replaced by the National Conference League and Conference League South in 2013.

History

National League Three

The original intention had been to create a pyramid of four divisions from Super League down to National League Four. National League Three was to consist of British Amateur Rugby League Association (BARLA) teams wishing to play in the summer whilst National League Four would be made up of Rugby League Conference teams. . A system of promotion and relegation between National Leagues Three and the semi-professional National League Two was to be gradually introduced.  However, there were insufficient applicants for a separate National League Three and National League Four, thus the two leagues were merged into a combined National League Three.

National League Three was founded with ten clubs; six (Teesside Steelers, Manchester Knights, Coventry Bears, Hemel Stags, St Albans Centurions and South London Storm (replacing Crawley Jets who elected to remain in the Rugby League Conference before the season started) came from the Rugby League Conference and four came from BARLA leagues (Bradford Dudley Hill, Sheffield Hillsborough Hawks and Warrington Woolston Rovers (now Warrington Wizards) came from the National Conference League and Huddersfield Underbank Rangers came from the Pennine League). The league was split into two regions with sides playing everyone in their region twice and those outside once except for one cross-region team they played twice giving 14 fixtures.

The 2004 season saw an expansion to fourteen teams with Birmingham Bulldogs, Carlisle Centurions and Essex Eels elected from the Rugby League Conference. Bramley Buffaloes, was admitted as a new club, though they can also be considered as a reincarnation of the previous Bramley club, which had long played in the professional leagues. Gateshead Storm also entered as late replacements for the defunct Teesside Steelers. The season was extended to twenty games starting a move towards a full season. Manchester Knights resigned from the league a few games before the end of the season.

Prior to the 2005 season South London Storm announced that they were joining the new Rugby League Conference South Premier Division and Manchester Knights decided to enter the Rugby League Conference Central Premier (though they were replaced by Dewsbury Celtic after two games). The league went to a home-and-away setup with 22 fixtures. Carlisle Centurions and Birmingham Bulldogs failed to complete the season, Coventry Bears and Essex Eels resigned after the season. Some felt the problems were a result of the change from a semi-regionalised structure to a full home and away set-up. All four of these found their way back into the Rugby League Conference.

Dewsbury Celtic moved up from the Rugby League Conference Central Premier and Featherstone Lions, just a month after failing to finish the season in the National Conference League, were accepted to National League Three to give it ten members for the 2006 season.

A few weeks into the 2006 season Sheffield Hillsborough Hawks withdrew, and Bradford Dudley Hill returned to the National Conference League after the season. St Albans Centurions also decided to join the Rugby League Conference Premier South Division, which left Hemel Stags as the only South of England team in the league.

Rugby League Conference National Division
In 2007 the National League Three teams were absorbed into the Rugby League Conference, rebranded as the Rugby League Conference National Division with the addition of three new teams from the Rugby League Conference North Premier (Leeds Akkies, Cottingham Phoenix and East Lancashire Lions). It is thought the rebranding was due to the number of teams withdrawing and the number of forfeited fixtures harming the image of the National Leagues as a whole, which was an issue while looking for a new sponsor. The new National Division was much more based around the North of England with Hemel the only non-Northern team. This seemed to add stability to the league and while Cottingham Phoenix were expelled there were no further withdrawals and a much higher fixture fulfilment rate.

The 2008 season saw Crusaders join the league for one season as they launched their Colts academy team too late to make the deadline for the reserves league. Liverpool Buccaneers also joined the league while Leeds Akkies dropped down to the Rugby League Conference Premier North. Bramley finished top of the league but the Colts won the Grand Final. During this season there were no withdrawals from the league and like the previous season a high fixture fulfilment rate.

In 2009, the league saw its first significant expansion since the name change, with Nottingham Outlaws making their debut and Carlisle Centurions returning to the league while Celtic Crusaders Colts joined the Super League Reserve grade and the Gilette National Youth League (older players in the former, Under 18s in the latter).

The National Division in 2010 saw Kippax Knights join the ranks following their elevation after winning the Yorkshire Premier title in 2009, with Gateshead Storm moving to the North East competition (where they merged with Newcastle Knights) and East Lancashire Lions taking a season’s sabbatical to secure a new home base (they resurfaced as Accrington & Leyland Lions in the North West Premier Division in 2011). Carlisle Centurions and Liverpool Buccaneers failed to complete the season in 2010.

2011 was the last National Division and saw the return of 2004 winners Coventry Bears and the return to Wales with Welsh Champions Valley Cougars stepping up. A return to Gateshead with a new team Gateshead Lightning (reserve team for Gateshead Thunder) was intended, but they failed to start the season.

National Conference League Division 3

With the heartlands' elite National Conference League voting to move to a summer season, the RLC National division became its third division albeit without automatic promotion due to minimum criteria. The division was a one-season only trial by the RFL and NCL to see how amateur clubs coped with travelling all over England and Wales to fulfil fixtures.

Dewsbury Celtic and Featherstone Lions rejoined the National Conference League in division two, with the eight remaining clubs being joined by two clubs stepping up from the final RLC Premier (Bristol Sonics and St Albans Centurions). Valley Cougars dropped back to the Welsh League after the teams were announced and were replaced by South Wales Hornets (a feeder club for South Wales Scorpions, based in Blackwood). Hemel Stags beat Huddersfield Underbank Rangers 17-10 in the Division 3 Grand Final on 29 September 2012.

Following the 2012 season, the league was not set to continue in the same format, after Hemel Stags were admitted to Championship 1, and Coventry Bears, Huddersfield Underbank Rangers and Nottingham Outlaws were among nine clubs invited to join the new-look National Conference League. Bramley Buffaloes subsequently released a press release claiming that this left them with an uncertain future. Nottingham Outlaws turned down the National Conference League application to join Conference League South along with Bristol Sonics and St Albans Centurions. Bramley Buffaloes and Kippax Knights dropped into the Yorkshire Men's League. Warrington Wizards were absorbed into Woolston Rovers who applied for the National Conference League and South Wales Hornets folded.

Teams of the final season

The teams played each other on a home and away basis. The top six teams then entered the end of season play-offs in the same format as the play-offs for the Super League and Championships. The winner of the grand final was awarded the RLC National title.

Results
Note: The standings given are from the regular season, thus some teams listed 1st did not go on to win the play-offs (and vice versa).

1 played as Warrington Woolston Rovers between 2003 and 2004
2 Manchester Knights failed to complete the season but withdrew near the end of the season and thus their results stood.
3 Bradford Dudley Hill qualified for the play-offs but declined to participate due to rejoining the National Conference League.
4 Liverpool Buccaneers failed to complete the season but withdrew near the end of the season and thus their results stood.

Key

See also

Rugby League Conference
National Conference League
Conference League South

References

External links
 Official website 
 Unofficial RLC website

Rugby League Conference
Rugby league in England
Rugby league in Wales